Joseph Andriyovych Tymchenko (1852–1924) was a Ukrainian inventor and mechanic who invented a type of a film camera.

A street in Odesa was named in his honor in 2016.

References

1852 births
1924 deaths
Ukrainian inventors
19th-century Ukrainian people
Cinema pioneers